Reginald Heber Thomas AFC (11 January 1907 – 14 March 1946) was a Welsh middle-distance runner. He competed at the 1928 and 1932 Summer Olympics and the 1930 British Empire Games. He missed the 1936 Summer Olympics because of injury, and did not compete in the 1934 British Empire Games for Wales, because of English objections. At both Olympics he was eliminated in the first round of the 1500 metres event. At the 1930 Empire Games in Hamilton, Ontario, he won the gold medal in the mile and the silver medal in the 880 yards. He could not compete for Wales because Wales did not have a national athletics association at the time. Welsh track and field athletes could only compete for England in 1930 although Welsh swimmers did compete for their home nation.

In 1931 he broke the 10 year old British record for the mile with 4 mins. 13.4 secs to underline his status as Britain’s leading miler. He also took the AAA mile title three times - in 1930, 1931 and 1933, also winning 8 Welsh titles between 1929 and 1936.

In 1940, Heber was commissioned in the Royal Air Force. On 8 June 1944 Thomas, now a flight lieutenant, was awarded the Air Force Cross (AFC).

He was buried at Haycombe Cemetery in Bath.

References

1907 births
1946 deaths
People from Pembroke, Pembrokeshire
Sportspeople from Pembrokeshire
Welsh male middle-distance runners
Olympic athletes of Great Britain
Athletes (track and field) at the 1928 Summer Olympics
Athletes (track and field) at the 1932 Summer Olympics
Commonwealth Games gold medallists for England
Commonwealth Games silver medallists for England
Commonwealth Games medallists in athletics
Athletes (track and field) at the 1930 British Empire Games
Welsh aviators
Royal Air Force squadron leaders
British World War II bomber pilots
Royal Air Force pilots of World War II
Recipients of the Air Force Cross (United Kingdom)
Aviators killed in aviation accidents or incidents in England
Medallists at the 1930 British Empire Games